The Girls Amateur Championship is a golf tournament held annually in the United Kingdom. Girls need to be under 18 on 1 January in the year of the championship.

Until World War II the championship was organised by a series of magazines and always held at Stoke Poges Golf Club near Slough. it was first held in 1919, although an event was planned in 1914 but was cancelled because of the start of World War I. After World War II it restarted in 1949 when the Ladies Golf Union took over the event. It is now run by The R&A, following the merger with the Ladies Golf Union in 2017.

Format
Currently the championship involves two rounds of stroke-play after which the 64 lowest scores compete in six rounds of match-play. Ties for 64th place are decided by countback. All match-play rounds are over 18 holes, except the final which is played over 36 holes, with extra holes played, if necessary, to decide the winner. Girls need to be under 18 on 1 January in the year of the championship.

History
The first attempt to run the event was in 1914, when The Gentlewoman magazine organised an event, for which Princess Mary, then 17, presented a trophy. The event was to have been played on 17 and 18 September at Stoke Poges Golf Club but was cancelled because of the start of World War I.

The 1919 event was organised by Mabel Stringer, the sports editor of The Gentlewoman. It was played on 17 and 18 September at Stoke Poges. 16 girls competed, having qualified through local events. Two rounds were played each day. The first winner of the Princess Mary trophy was Audrey Croft, from Ashford Manor, who beat Christina Clarke, from Reddish Vale, by 1 hole in the final. The two finalists in 1919 met again in 1920, Miss Clarke winning this time at the 21st hole. The first overseas winner was Simone de la Chaume from France, who beat Dorothy Pearson in 1924. The 1926 championship was won by another French girl, Diana Esmond, who beat Margaret Ramsden in the final. Ramsden had beaten Esmond's sister, Sybil in the semi-final. Diana Fishwick became the first two-time winner, winning in 1927 and 1928 while Pauline Doran won three times in a row, 1930, 1931 and 1932. Doran had beaten Dorrit Wilkins in the final in both 1930 and 1931 and beat Aline de Gunzbourg from France, in 1932.

1932 was the first year that The Bystander magazine organised the event. The Gentlewoman magazine had merged with Eve: The Lady's Pictorial, later to become Britannia and Eve, and the event had been known as the Eve's Girls Championship since 1927. Nancy Jupp became the youngest winner when she won the 1934 championship at the age of 13, beating Joan Montford, nearly five years older, in the final. There was a French winner again in 1937, Lally Vagliano beating the defending champion, Peggy Edwards, in the final. The 1939 championship was planned for September but was cancelled because of the start of World War II. The first England–Scotland match was held in 1935, on the Monday before the start of the championship. Scotland won by 5 matches to 2.

The event was not restarted after the war until the Ladies Golf Union took over the organisation of the event in 1949. Played at Beaconsfield Golf Club, the tournament was won by Pam Davies, a Coventry medical student, who beat Arlette Jacquet, from Belgium, by one hole. The first post-war overseas winner was Brigitte Varangot from France who won at North Berwick in 1957, beating the defending champion Ruth Porter in the final. Varangot reached the final the following year at Cotswold Hills but lost to Tessa Ross Steen in the final. It was not until 1969 that there was another overseas winner, Joyce de Witt Puyt, from the Netherlands, beating the Belgian Corinne Reybroeck in the final. Reybroeck had also been runner-up in 1968. Since 1969 the number of overseas winners has increased, outnumbering British winners, although two Scots, Jane Connachan and Mhairi McKay are the only girls since the war to win the championship twice. The event is now run by The R&A, following the merger with the LGU in 2017. In 2022 the final was extended from 18 to 36 holes.

Results

Source:

Future venues
2023 - Ganton
2024 - Alwoodley

References

External links

Junior golf tournaments
R&A championships
Amateur golf tournaments in the United Kingdom
Youth sport in the United Kingdom
1919 establishments in the United Kingdom
Recurring sporting events established in 1919